Gregor Gall (born 1967) is a British left-wing academic and writer, who has taught at several British universities.

Career
He was professor of industrial relations at the University of Bradford and before then professors of industrial relations at the University of Stirling and the University of Hertfordshire. He is now an affiliate research associate in the School of Law and the School of Social and Political Sciences at the University of Glasgow, a visiting professor at the University of Leeds and an honorary professor at the University of Waikato, New Zealand. He researches and writes primarily about trade unions, and has a particular interest in the labour movement politics of Scotland – for example, he is working on a research project examining union leadership and the disproportionate contribution of Scots to the British-wide union movement at senior levels (like general secretaries).

He is author and editor of numerous academic books, and is also a politically engaged academic, whereby he has regularly contributed to the Morning Star, The Guardian'sComment is free website, the Frontline magazine, The Conversation, The Scotsman, The Huffington Post, The National and a number of other media outlets, such as the journal of the ASLEF train drivers' Locomotive union and Tribune. He also provides research and consultancy to a number of unions, particularly the Fire Brigades Union, and is a frequent commentator in the media on matters of unions and industrial conflict. He was also a correspondent for Planetlabor from 2009 to 2016.

Political views
Originally a member of Labour Students and the Labour Party from 1985, he ended his membership of these in 1988 over the issue of the poll tax, then joining the Socialist Workers' Party (SWP) in 1990. He joined the Scottish Socialist Party (SSP) in advance of the SWP joining en masse, leaving the SWP in 2004 after many years of growing disagreements. He has been a member of the editorial board of the Scottish Left Review since 2003, is editor of its book arm, the Scottish Left Review Press, and has been the editor of the journal of the Scottish Labour History Society, called Scottish Labour History since 2008 (then since 2015 as joint editor with Jim Philips of the University of Glasgow). Following the resignation of Robin McAlpine as Director of the Jimmy Reid Foundation and Editor of the Scottish Left Review to concentrate on the Commonweal, Gall stepped in as Director and Editor. Gall has been a member of the board of management of the Jimmy Reid Foundation since its inception. Gall resigned as Director and Editor in December 2022. He has written a lengthy and detailed biography of Tommy Sheridan (Welsh Academic Press, 2012).

Scottish independence campaign
In late 2013, he published his contribution to the case for Scottish independence entitled Scotland the brave? Independence and radical social change. The key arguments concerned not relying on the SNP and establishing a connection between the material grievances of ordinary citizens and the possibilities of higher standards of living and better life chances under independence as a result of rolling back the tentacles of neo-liberalism.

Biography of Bob Crow
Following the sudden and unexpected death of RMT general secretary Bob Crow in March 2014, Gall has written a political biography of him, examining what lessons can be learnt for the union movement from his style of leadership in espousing militant, oppositional politics. The biography was published by Manchester University Press in March 2017 on the third anniversary of his death.

The Punk Rock Politics of Joe Strummer
An extended analysis of the politics of Joe Strummer and their impact was published by Gall in June 2022 to mark the twentieth anniversary of the death of Strummer, one of the most influential radical musicians of the twentieth century. The study draws on original testimony to explore how Strummer inspired many to adopt left-wing politics and others to sustain them in their left-wing politics.

Mick Lynch: The making of a working-class hero
Manchester University Press will publish Professor Gregor Gall's Mick Lynch: The making of a working-class hero in late 2023. The book is a combined biographical and sociological study of Lynch as he became a leading left-wing public figure from the early summer of 2022 onwards.

Publications

As author
 The Meaning of Militancy? Postal workers and industrial relations, 2003, Ashgate, pp350 (and 2019 via Routledge Revivals series).
 The Political Economy of Scotland: Red Scotland? Radical Scotland?, 2005, University of Wales Press, pp260.
 Sex Worker Union Organizing: An International Study, 2006, Palgrave, pp252.
 Labour Unionism in the Financial Services Sector: struggling for rights and representation, Ashgate, 2008, pp212, 
 Tommy Sheridan: From Hero to Zero? A Political Biography, Welsh Academic Press, 2012, pp360, .
 An Agency of Their Own: sex worker union organising, Zero, 2012, pp97, .
 Scotland the brave? Independence and radical social change, Scottish Left Review Press, 2013, pp60, .
 Sex worker unionisation: global developments, challenges and possibilities, Palgrave, 2016, pp240, .  
 Bob Crow – fighter, leader, socialist, Manchester University Press, 2017, . 
 Employment Relations in Financial Services: an exploration of the employee experience after the financial crash, Palgrave 2017, pp260 .
 The Punk Rock Politics of Joe Strummer: resistance, rebellion and radicalism, Manchester University Press, 2022, pp304 .
 Mick Lynch: The making of a working-class hero, Manchester University Press, 2023.
 Scarlet Scotland – the paradox of radicalism, Welsh Academic Press, 2024.

As editor
Union Organising: campaigning for trade union recognition. Edited collection, 2003, Routledge, pp272.
Union Recognition: Organising and Bargaining Outcomes. Edited collection, 2006, Routledge, pp260.
Is there a Scottish Road to Socialism? 2007, Scottish Left Review Press, Glasgow, pp137.
Union Revitalisation in Advanced Economies: assessing the contribution of ‘union organising’, Palgrave, 2009, pp240.
The Future of Union Organising – building for tomorrow, Palgrave, 2009, pp256.
 New Forms and Expressions of Conflict at Work, Palgrave, 2013, pp272. 
 Time to choose: is there a Scottish road to socialism? 2013, Scottish Left Review Press, Glasgow, second edition, pp196, .
 Is there a Scottish road to socialism? 2016, Scottish Left Review Press, Glasgow, third edition, . 
The International Handbook of Labour, Work and Employment, Edward Elgar, Cheltenham, 2019, pp464, .
A New Scotland: Building an Equal, Fair and Sustainable Society, Pluto Press, London, 2022, pp352 .
Handbook on Labour Unions, Agenda Publishers, Newcastle, 2023.
 As co-editor
The International Handbook of Labour Unions: Responses to Neo-liberalism, Edward Elgar, Cheltenham, 2011, . 
Global anti-unionism – nature, dynamics, trajectories and outcomes, Palgrave, 2013, .

References

Academics of the University of Hertfordshire
1967 births
Living people
Date of birth missing (living people)
Place of birth missing (living people)
British columnists
Academics of the University of Bradford
Academics of the University of Stirling